The Johnson House, in Mandeville in St. Tammany Parish, Louisiana, was substantially built c.1915, redeveloping from a c.1890 predecessor. It is located three blocks from Lake Pontchartrain.  It has been marketed as an event venue, Maison Lafitte, with phrase "circa 1880".

It is a "mansion" on a "lush"  property.

It was purchased in about 1915 by Thomas Johnson and his wife Mary Celeste, who maintained homes in New Orleans and Mandeville, and who developed it in Mediterranean Revival and/or Craftsman style.  It was home to Johnson descendants until 2001.

It was listed on the National Register of Historic Places in 2002.

See also
Griffin's Bakery, at 301 Lafitte St., also NRHP-listed

References

External links

Maison Lafitte, official website

National Register of Historic Places in St. Tammany Parish, Louisiana
Buildings and structures completed in 1915
Mediterranean Revival architecture in Louisiana
American Craftsman architecture in Louisiana